Kuguno Bosai Dam is an earthfill dam located in Gifu Prefecture in Japan. The dam is used for flood control. The catchment area of the dam is 4.9 km2. The dam impounds about 16  ha of land when full and can store 1462 thousand cubic meters of water. The construction of the dam was started on 1965 and completed in 1974.

References

Dams in Gifu Prefecture
1974 establishments in Japan